Spilarctia kebea is a moth in the family Erebidae. It was described by George Thomas Bethune-Baker in 1904. It is found in New Guinea, where it has been recorded from Papua and Papua New Guinea.

References

K
Moths of New Guinea
Moths of Papua New Guinea
Moths described in 1904